

Thomas Holmes (November 5, 1903 – March 25, 1975) was an American sports writer who covered the Brooklyn Dodgers for the Brooklyn Eagle and the New York Herald-Tribune, from 1924 to 1957.

Holmes, who only had one arm, died in March 1975 at age 71.

He was posthumously awarded the J. G. Taylor Spink Award by the National Baseball Hall of Fame and Museum, announced in 1979 and inducted in 1980.

Works

References

Further reading

External links
Baseball Hall of Fame

1903 births
1975 deaths
People from Brooklyn
Sportswriters from New York (state)
Baseball writers
BBWAA Career Excellence Award recipients